Alton is a village in Staffordshire, England. It is noted for the theme park Alton Towers, built around the site of Alton Mansion, which was owned by the Earls of Shrewsbury, and designed by Augustus Pugin. In the 1914 map by Whiston, there were copper works in the village.

The village is on the eastern side of the Churnet. It is mentioned in the Domesday Book, and contains numerous buildings of architectural interest; the Round-House, Alton Castle (now a Catholic youth retreat centre), St Peter's Church, The Malt House, St John's Church and Alton Towers.

Alton was served by the Alton railway station which was opened by the North Staffordshire Railway on 13 July 1849 and closed in January 1965.

The Chained Oak in Alton has been made famous by the ride Hex – The Legend of the Towers at Alton Towers and the legend involving the Earl of Shrewsbury.

See also
Listed buildings in Alton, Staffordshire

References

External links
 
 Information on Saint Peter's church
 Saint Peter's church
 Photographs of Alton
 
 
 Cheadle and Tean Times  - Local Newspaper covering Alton news and events

 
Villages in Staffordshire
Towns and villages of the Peak District
Staffordshire Moorlands